Hampshire is a village in Kane County, Illinois, United States. As of the 2020 census it had a population of 7,667.

Geography
Most of the village is in Hampshire Township, and a small portion extends east into Rutland Township. The village is bordered to the northeast by Huntley and to the southeast by Pingree Grove.

Illinois Route 72 passes through the southern part of the village, leading east  to Starks and west  to Genoa. U.S. Route 20 passes through the northeastern outskirts of the village, leading northwest  to Marengo and southeast  to Elgin.

Demographics

As of the 2020 census, there were 7,667 people and 2,773 housing units in Hampshire, a population spike of 37.8% from the 2010 census.

As of the census of 2000, there were 2,490 people, 1,015 households, and 792 families residing in the village. The racial makeup of the village was 98.21% White, 0.10% African American, 0.38% Native American, 0.14% Asian, and 0.62% from other races. Hispanic or Latino of any race were 2.41% of the population.   
   
There were 1,015 households, out of which 42.0% had children under the age of 18 living with them, 66.6% were married couples living together, 7.9% had a female householder with no husband present, and 21.9% were non-families. 17.5% of all households were made up of individuals, and 7.6% had someone living alone who was 65 years of age or older. The average household size was 2.86 and the average family size was 3.28.   
   
In the village, the population was spread out, with 29.7% under the age of 18, 6.8% from 18 to 24, 32.1% from 25 to 44, 20.2% from 45 to 64, and 11.3% who were 65 years of age or older. The median age was 35 years. For every 100 females, there were 92.8 males. For every 100 females age 18 and over, there were 89.8 males.   
   
The median income for a household in the village was $58,519, and the median income for a family was $65,069. Males had a median income of $42,217 versus $29,934 for females. The per capita income for the village was $22,143. About 2.3% of families and 2.9% of the population were below the poverty line, including 2.5% of those under age 18 and 9.2% of those age 65 or over.

Education
The Hampshire school system consists of Hampshire High School, Hampshire Middle School, Hampshire Elementary School, and Gary D. Wright Elementary. The high school's mascot is the "Whip-Pur", a cat-like creature whose name derives from the school colors, white and purple.

Notable people
 Charles H. Backus, Illinois state representative and businessman
 Jake Goebbert, former San Diego Padres player, graduate of Hampshire High School.

References

External links
 Village of Hampshire official website
 Hampshire Area Chamber of Commerce
 

Villages in Illinois
Villages in Kane County, Illinois